Joseph Pease may refer to:

 Joseph Pease (railway pioneer) (1799–1872), railway owner, first Quaker elected Member of Parliament
 Sir Joseph Pease, 1st Baronet (1828–1903), MP 1865–1903, full name Joseph Whitwell Pease, son of Joseph Pease (1799–1872)
 Jack Pease, 1st Baron Gainford (Joseph Albert Pease, 1860–1943), son of Joseph Whitwell Pease
 Joseph Pease, 2nd Baron Gainford (1889–1971), only son of the above
 Joseph Pease, 3rd Baron Gainford (1921–2013), son of the above
 Joseph Pease (India reformer) (1772–1846), English Quaker activist, uncle of Joseph Pease (1799–1872)
 Joseph Walker Pease (1820–1882), MP for Kingston upon Hull

See also
 Pease family (Darlington)
 Pease (disambiguation)